Beddome's worm snake (Gerrhopilus beddomii) is a species of harmless blind snake in the family Gerrhopilidae. The species is native to southern India. No subspecies are currently recognized.

Etymology
G. beddomii is named after Richard Henry Beddome (1830-1911), a British army officer and botanist.

Geographic range
Beddome's worm snake is found in southern India in the Western Ghats and in the Kimedy Hills near Visakhapatnam in eastern India.

The type locality given is "Hills of the Indian Peninsula ... Kimedy Hills, (Visakhapatnam district) and in the Anaimalai and Travancore Hills between 2000 and 5000 feet" (about 600–1500 m).

Habitat

Description
Dorsally, it is brown, often with a darker vertebral line. Ventrally, it is paler brown. The rounded snout and the anal region are whitish.

Reproduction
G. beddomii is oviparous.

References

Further reading

Boulenger GA (1890). The Fauna of British India, Including Ceylon and Burma. Reptilia and Batrachia. London: Secretary of State for India in Council. (Taylor & Francis, printers). xviii + 541 pp. (Typhlops beddomii, new species, p. 237).
Boulenger GA (1893). Catalogue of the Snakes in the British Museum (Natural History). Volume I., Containing the Families Typhlopidæ, ... London: Trustees of the British Museum (Natural History). (Taylor and Francis, printers). xiii + 440 pp. + Plates I–XXVIII. (Typhlops beddomii, p. 18 + Plate I, Figures 3a, 3b, 3c, 3d).
Sharma RC (2003). Handbook: Indian Snakes. Kolkata: Zoological Survey of India. 292 pp. .
Smith MA (1943). The Fauna of British India, Ceylon and Burma, Including the  Whole of the Indo-Chinese Sub-region. Reptilia and Amphibia. Vol. III.—Serpentes. London: Secretary of State for India. (Taylor and Francis, printers). xii + 583 pp. (Typhlops beddomei, pp. 54–55).
Vidal N, Marin J, Morini M, Donnellan S, Branch WR, Thomas R, Vences M, Wynn A, Cruaud C, Hedges SB (2010). "Blindsnake evolutionary tree reveals long history on Gondwana". Biology Letters 6: 558–561.
Whitaker R, Captain A (2008). Snakes of India: The Field Guide. Chennai: Draco Books. 495 pp. .

Gerrhopilus
Reptiles described in 1890
Taxa named by George Albert Boulenger